Indwe Hospital is a Provincial government funded hospital in Indwe in the Emalahleni Local Municipality, Eastern Cape area in South Africa.

The hospital departments include Emergency department, Out Patients Department, Paediatric ward, Maternity ward, Surgical Services, Medical Services, Operating Theatre & CSSD Services, Pharmacy, Anti-Retroviral (ARV) treatment for HIV/AIDS, Post Trauma Counseling Services, Laundry Services, Kitchen Services and Mortuary.

References 
 Indwe Hospital

Hospitals in the Eastern Cape
Emalahleni Local Municipality, Eastern Cape